Brancaccio is a neighbourhood in the municipality of Palermo, Sicily, in Italy. It is a semi-traditional area of the working class. It was important in the history of the Cosa Nostra.

Antimafia priest Pino Puglisi worked in the neighbourhood. He was the pastor of San Gaetano's Parish and spoke out against the Mafia. He was killed on September 15, 1993, on the orders of the local Mafia bosses, the brothers Filippo and Giuseppe Graviano.

References

External links
 Il quartiere Brancaccio, di Giorgio Paonita, studioso di Storia Medievale

Zones of Palermo